Oleksandr Oleksandrovych Bogomolets (/Oleksandr Oleksandrovych Bohomolets; 24 May 1881 – 19 July 1946) was a Soviet and Ukrainian pathophysiologist.

His father was the physician and revolutionary Oleksandr Mykhailovych Bogomolets (1850–1935).

He was president of the National Academy of Sciences of Ukraine and director of the Institute of clinical Physiology in Kyiv. His laboratories were located in Georgia, where he had a permanent research unit attached to the Academy of Sciences (1937). According to Zhores Medvedev, this was made possible by Stalin, who wanted members of the Experimental Institute to study the extension of life expectancy. He developed antireticular cytotoxic serum. In 1938, in Kyiv, Oleksandr Bogomolets convened the world’s first scientific conference on aging and longevity.

Honours and awards
 Hero of Socialist Labour (4 February 1944) – for outstanding achievements in science, to create valuable products for the treatment of wounds and bone fractures
 Two Orders of Lenin
 Order of the Patriotic War, 1st class
 Order of the Red Banner of Labour
 Medal "For Valiant Labour in the Great Patriotic War 1941–1945"
Stalin Prize, 1st class (1941)

Bogomolets National Medical University (NMU) is a medical school founded in 1841 in Kyiv, Russian Empire by the Russian Tsar Nicolas I. The university is named after Bogomolets.

Books
 The Prolongation of Life, by Oleksandr O. Bogomolets. Translated by Peter V. Karpovich, M.D., and Sonia Bleeker, Bogomolets, O. O. (Oleksandr Oleksandrovych), 1881–1946, New York, Essential Books, Duell, Sloan & Pearce, Inc. [1946]

References

Articles

External links

1881 births
1946 deaths
20th-century Ukrainian scientists
People from Kievsky Uyezd
Scientists from Kyiv
Academicians of the USSR Academy of Medical Sciences
Full Members of the USSR Academy of Sciences
Presidents of the National Academy of Sciences of Ukraine
First convocation members of the Verkhovna Rada of the Ukrainian Soviet Socialist Republic
First convocation members of the Soviet of the Union
Second convocation members of the Soviet of the Union
Heroes of Socialist Labour
Stalin Prize winners
Recipients of the Order of Lenin
Recipients of the Order of the Red Banner of Labour
Biogerontologists
Life extensionists
Soviet physiologists
Ukrainian physiologists
